Winterplay (Korean: 윈터플레이）is a pop-jazz artist from South Korea currently consisting of one member: Juhan Lee as producer, songwriter and trumpet player. Winterplay debuted in 2007 and has 4 full albums out, with the last album titled, “Jazz Cookin’” 2019 (https://vibe.naver.com/album/2903136). Juhan created the project in November 2007 and by 2008, Juhan succeeded signing an International distribution deal with Universal Music Japan for worldwide distribution. (From 2008 to 2015 the band included the lead vocalist Haewon (Haewon Moon / Moon Hye-won), with bassist Eunkyu So (So Eun Kyu) and guitarist Saza-Woojoon Choi as supporting members.) Winterplay has not only earned attention from Korea, but also creating waves in Japan and rest of the world as a first leader of "Jazz Hallyu". Debuting in 2007, Juhan Lee is a producer, songwriter and trumpet player. His latest jazz ballad, “Gganbu (067 & 240)” was inspired by Netflix Drama “Squid Games” featuring the Korean instrument, Haegum.  Winterplay was the Music Show Runner for International Jazz Day 2022, which was funded by the City of Seoul, and produced by Loudpigs Music, where he also served as the music producer. In the 90 mins show, Winterplay hosted the show, performed under the band he formed for the International Jazz Day 2022 occasion and directed over 30 jazz musicians in 4 venues in Seoul.

History
In 2008, Winterplay was charted No. 1 in the jazz section of iTunes, and became the first Asian artist to perform at Billboard Live in Japan. Since his first international debut in Japan in 2009 with his Songs of Colored Love album, he has released in 26 countries worldwide, with an international release showcase in London in 2010. Currently, Winterplay has 2 Gold Records in the category of Jazz in Korea for “Hot Summerplay”, and in Hong Kong for his second album Sunshines. The Sunshines album release in Hong Kong's record franchise HMV, ranked no. 1 for the best-selling jazz album.
In 2013, Winterplay was invited to Jade Solid Gold, one of the most prestigious music shows in Hong Kong. He was the first musician to be featured from abroad.
In 2014, Winterplay was invited to “The Sky Jazz: A Tribute to King” set to open on December 20 in Bangkok along with several big-name global musicians such as the Count Basie Orchestra, Larry Carlton, John Pizzarelli and Diane Schuur. Except for some Thai musicians, Winterplay was the only Asian band to perform in this festival.
His third album titled Two Fabulous Fools was released in Korea on July 17, 2013. As of October, 2013, Universal Music Hong Kong has also signed Winterplay for his release of Two Fabulous Fools in Hong Kong, China, Taiwan, Macau, Thailand, Singapore and Indonesia.
Winterplay released his fourth album titled " Jazz Cookin' " in Korea on March, 2019.

Music Style

 The genre of Winterplay's music is on the borders between jazz, pop, latin, and lounge. Unlike typical jazz songs dependent on piano, the strength of Winterplay's music is the pop feeling, strong melody, and short length without piano. Their jazz style is influenced by Louis Armstrong and it was decided to fuse their love of pop and jazz.

Band members
Juhan Lee - producer, songwriter, jazz trumpeter

Discography

Tours and Concerts

Korea and International
 "Soul of Seoul Celebrates International Jazz Day 2022", Online Concert (April, 2022)
 "VISTAGE Voice 1 - Let's Get Lost with Winterplay", Vista Walkerhill Seoul (August, 2019) 
 "Jazz Cookin' - DJ Soulscape Curated 12", Hyundai Card Understage, Seoul (April, 2019)
 "Nonstop Summer Fever - Curated 24" , Hyundai Card Understage, Seoul (July, 2016)
 "Jazz Concert" Macao Cultural Centre (December, 2015)
 "Nonstop Jazz Fever", LG Art Hall, Seoul (April, 2014)
 "Jazz World Live Series" , Hong Kong (December, 2012)
 Japan Sunset Live Festival, Japan (September, 2011)
 Japan Hayama Tribute to Bill Evans, in Japan, Japan (August, 2011)
 Sapporo International Jazz Festival, Japan (July, 2011)
 Hong Kong Summer Jazz Festival 2011, Hong Kong (May, 2011) 
 Mister Kelley's, Osaka (March, 2011)
 Tour Concert in Japan "2011 Spring Tour", Toured 13 cities in Japan from North to South (March, 2011)
 Tour Concer in Japan "Scene of Winter", Sendai, Iwaki, Kanai, Tokyo, Osaka, Shimonoeki (November, 2010)
 JZ Brat Jazz Club, Tokyo (November 2010)
 Worldwide Release Party and Showcase in London, England (September, 2010)
 Thames Festival Concert, England (September, 2010)
 Live Tour in Japan, Blue Note Nagoya (September, 2010)
 Live Tour in Japan, Blues Alley Tokyo (September, 2010)
 Japan Kanazawa Jazz Festival, Japan (September, 2010)
 Billboard Live Concert in Japan, Tokyo and Osaka (November, 2009)
 Korea Philippines 60 Years Friendship Concert in Manila, Philippines (September, 2009)
 1st Show case in Japan, Rolling Stone in Roppongi, Tokyo (June, 2009)
 Tokyo Asia Music Market Representing Korea, Japan (October, 2008)

References

South Korean musical groups
Musical groups established in 2007
2007 establishments in South Korea
Jazz-pop musicians
South Korean jazz ensembles